Josef "Joe" Stöckel (27 September 1894, Munich – 14 June 1959) was a German actor, screenwriter and film director.

Selected filmography

Actor
 The Villa in Tiergarten Park (1927)
 The Champion Shot (1932)
 S.A.-Mann Brand (1933)
 The Master Detective (1933)
 Between Heaven and Earth (1934)
 The Unsuspecting Angel (1936)
 There Were Two Bachelors (1936)
 The Sinful Village (1940)
 Two in One Suit (1950)
  Trouble in Paradise (1950)
 The White Adventure (1952)
 The Chaste Libertine (1952)
 The Imaginary Invalid (1952)
 Monks, Girls and Hungarian Soldiers (1952) 
 The Uncle from America (1953)
  The Monastery's Hunter (1953)
 The Sinful Village (1954)
 The Sweetest Fruits (1954)
 The Royal Waltz (1955)
 The Spanish Fly (1955)
 The Double Husband (1955)
 Through the Forests and Through the Trees (1956)
 Two Bavarians in St. Pauli (1956)
 Love, Summer and Music (1956)
 Two Bavarians in the Jungle (1957)
 Two Bavarians in the Harem (1957)
 Between Munich and St. Pauli (1957)
 Twelve Girls and One Man (1959)

Director
 Der Etappenhase (1937)
 The Right to Love (1939)
 A Heart Beats for You (1949)
  Trouble in Paradise (1950)
  Marriage Strike (1953)

References

External links

1894 births
1959 deaths
Male actors from Munich
German male film actors
German male silent film actors
Film people from Munich
Burials at the Ostfriedhof (Munich)
20th-century German male actors